is a train station in the city of Takahama, Aichi Prefecture, Japan, operated by Meitetsu.

Lines

Station layout
The station  has a single island platform with an elevated station building above the platform. The station has automated ticket machines, Manaca automated turnstiles and is unattended.

Platforms

Adjacent stations

|-
!colspan=5|Nagoya Railroad

Station history
Mikawa Takahama Station was opened on April 20, 1918, as a station on the privately-owned Mikawa Railway Company.  The Mikawa Railway Company was taken over by Meitetsu on June 1, 1941. The station building was rebuilt in 1994 as an elevated station, built on an overpass above the platforms and tracks.

Passenger statistics
In fiscal 2017, the station was used by an average of 4,332 passengers daily.

Surrounding area
Takahama City Hall
Takahama High School

See also
 List of Railway Stations in Japan

References

External links

 Official web page 

Railway stations in Japan opened in 1918
Railway stations in Aichi Prefecture
Stations of Nagoya Railroad
Takahama, Aichi